Expo/Sepulveda station is an elevated light rail station in Los Angeles. It serves the E Line.

History

Originally "Vervain" station, it was renamed "Home Junction" when it became the junction point with the Soldier's Home Branch, a route heading north along the west side of Sepulveda Boulevard to the Streetcar Depot building on the Sawtelle Veterans Home grounds.

Much of the former right-of-way for the Home Branch can be seen, but it is no longer contiguous as various sections have been sold and developed.

Location and design

Located at the intersection of Sepulveda Boulevard and Exposition Boulevard in West Los Angeles, the station is a short distance from the major intersection of Sepulveda and Pico Boulevards. The station is elevated over Sepulveda Boulevard with a single center platform. A new two-story parking structure was also built to the south of the station.

The Final Environmental Impact Report (EIR) for Expo Phase 2 designated this station as at-grade However, the report also included a design option for an elevated station should the additional funds become available. The $5.3 million cost difference was ultimately allocated by the Los Angeles City Council on March 18, 2011, and the elevated option was approved by the Expo Board on the same day.

A concrete processing plant located just north of the station site, on the west side of Sepulveda between Exposition and Pico Boulevards, was purchased by Casden Properties, who plans to build a large mixed-use transit development on the site, including 538 apartments and a Target store

Hours and frequency

Connections 
, the following connections are available:
 Big Blue Bus (Santa Monica): 7, Express 7, Rapid 7, 17
 Culver CityBus: 6, Rapid 6 to  LAX
 Los Angeles Metro Bus:  , Rapid  to Sylmar/San Fernando station

References

 Curbed Staff (November 24, 2014) "Expo Line Extension is 80 Percent Done; See the New Stations" Curbed Los Angeles

E Line (Los Angeles Metro) stations
Sepulveda Boulevard
West Los Angeles
Railway stations in the United States opened in 2016
Railway stations in Los Angeles
2016 establishments in California
Pacific Electric stations